Jeleń may refer to the following places:

Jeleń, Kuyavian-Pomeranian Voivodeship (north-central Poland)
Jeleń, Łódź Voivodeship (central Poland)
Jeleń, Lublin Voivodeship (east Poland)
Jeleń, Lubusz Voivodeship (west Poland)
Jeleń, Pomeranian Voivodeship (north Poland)
Jeleń, Silesian Voivodeship, near Jaworzno (south Poland)
Jeleń, Działdowo County in Warmian-Masurian Voivodeship (north Poland)
Jeleń, Mrągowo County in Warmian-Masurian Voivodeship (north Poland)
Jeleń, Pisz County in Warmian-Masurian Voivodeship (north Poland)
Jeleń, West Pomeranian Voivodeship (north-west Poland)

See also
Jelen